Mohamed Uvais Mohamed Ali Sabry, PC, MP (Sinhala: මොහොමඩ් උවයිස් මොහොමඩ් අලි සබ්රි, Tamil: மோஹமட் உவைஸ் மோஹமட் அலி சப்ரி ),  (born 1 May 1970), also known as Ali Sabry, is a Sri Lankan lawyer and politician. He is the Current Minister of External Affairs serving since 22 July 2022. He previously served as the Minister of Finance until 9 May 2022. He was a Member of Parliament, appointed from the national list of the Sri Lanka Podujana Peramuna. He also served as the Minister of Justice until 9 May 2022. He served as the defense counsel of President Gotabaya Rajapaksa, chief legal adviser and President of the Muslim Federation of the Sri Lanka Podujana Peramuna.

Beginning 4 April 2022, Sabry was appointed as the new Minister of Finance, replacing Basil Rajapaksa (brother of President Gotabaya Rajapaksa) in the position. Due to the worsening of the financial crisis, Sabry tendered his resignation 5 April 2022, having served only a day in office. However, Sabry revoked his resignation and resumed office as the Minister of Finance of Sri Lanka. After the resignation of Prime Minister Mahinda Rajapaksa, the cabinet was dissolved on 9 May 2022.

Early life and education
Born in Kalutara to M.S.M Uvais and Zareena Uvais, Sabry was educated at Kalutara Muslim Central College and Zahira College, Colombo. He entered Sri Lanka Law College  where he was a notable student leader and was elected General Secretary of the Law Students’ Union, elected President of the SLFP Law Students’ Union and also led the Law College Sinhala debating team. He was admitted to the Sri Lankan bar as an Attorney-at- Law in 1995.

Legal career 
Having qualified as an attorney at law, Sabry joined the Unofficial Bar and developed a lucrative practice in original and appellate courts specializing in civil law. He served as Sri Lankan Consul General in Jeddah, Saudi Arabia and represented Sri Lanka in many International conferences including the Human Rights Session in the United Nations Human Rights Council in March 2012. He was the treasurer of the Bar Association of Sri Lanka and Chairman of the Junior Bar Committee of the Bar Association of Sri Lanka. In 2012 he was appointed a President's Counsel. At the time of his appointment he was the youngest ever President's Counsel

In 2019 Sabry defended the then defense secretary Gotabaya Rajapaksa when the latter was accused of holding US citizenship in the runup to the 2019 Sri Lankan presidential election, and insisted that Gotabaya wasn't a US citizen, presenting evidence.

In 2020 he appeared in court cases for Rajapaksa, who was accused of corruption during the Presidency of Mahinda Rajapaksa.

Political career
He campaigned for Gotabaya Rajapakse during the 2019 Sri Lankan presidential election and urged the Muslim community to vote for him to form a stable government following the pressure on the community aftermath the 2019 Easter attacks.

He entered the mainstream politics in 2020 and became a member of SLPP. In July 2020, he was appointed as the national leader of the SLPP party's Muslim Federation by the President.

He did not contest at the 2020 Sri Lankan parliamentary election but was named by SLPP as a national list candidate to enter the parliament. On 12 August 2020, he was appointed as the Justice minister by the President Gotabaya Rajapaksa in his cabinet during the swearing-in ceremony and was the only Muslim person in the 25 member cabinet of ministers for the 16th Parliament of Sri Lanka. He was the first President's Counsel to serve as Minister of Justice after M. W. H. de Silva, QC.

On 4 April 2022, he was part of the temporary four member cabinet which was formed following the resignation of 26 cabinet ministers from their ministerial portfolios in wake of the economic crisis and protests. He was also one of the 26 ministers to resign but was given a new ministry by the President soon afterwards so he was part of the temporary cabinet. The following day, on 5 April 2022 he quit the temporary cabinet by resigning from the finance ministry which was handed over to him in the new temporary cabinet. But, later on 8 April 2022, he informed the House that he would continue as the Finance Minister because the President did not accept his resignation and served until his government was dissolved on 9 May 2022. He was appointed the Minister of Foreign Affairs replacing G. L. Peiris on 22 July 2022.

Racist attacks 
His appointment as a Justice minister was controversial. He also faced criticisms and backlash for his remarks on the government's decision and Ministry of Health, Nutrition and Indigenous Medicine's decision for prohibition of burials and a proper cremation process of the Muslims who died due to the COVID-19 pandemic in Sri Lanka.

References 

Living people
Alumni of Zahira College, Colombo
20th-century Sri Lankan lawyers
Sri Lanka Podujana Peramuna politicians
President's Counsels (Sri Lanka)
Members of the 16th Parliament of Sri Lanka
Finance ministers of Sri Lanka
Sri Lankan Muslims
1970 births
21st-century Sri Lankan lawyers